Krisztián Lisztes (born 6 May 2005) is a Hungarian professional footballer who plays as a midfielder for the Nemzeti Bajnokság I club Ferencváros.

Club career
Lisztes is a youth product of the academies of Újpesti Haladás FK, Dalnoki Akadémia, Mészöly Focisuli, MTK Budapest, Soroksár and Ferencváros. He made his professional debut as a late substitute with Ferencváros in a 2–1 Nemzeti Bajnokság I win over Gyirmót on 14 May 2022. He spent the 2022–23 season on loan with their partner club Soroksár in the Nemzeti Bajnokság II. On 10 January 2023, he signed his first professional contract with Ferencváros.

International career
Lisztes  is a youth international for Hungary, having played up to the Hungary U19s.

Personal life
Lisztes is the son of the retired Hungarian footballer with the same name, Krisztián Lisztes Sr.

Honours
Ferencváros
 Nemzeti Bajnokság I: 2021–22

References

External links
 
 MLSZ Profile

2005 births
Living people
Footballers from Budapest
Hungarian footballers
Hungary youth international footballers
Association football midfielders
Ferencvárosi TC footballers
Soroksár SC players
Nemzeti Bajnokság I players
Nemzeti Bajnokság II players